1,1'-Diaminoferrocene is the organoiron compound with the formula .  It is the simplest diamine derivative of ferrocene.  It is a yellow, air-sensitive solid that is soluble in aqueous acid. The 1,1' part of its name refers to the location of the amine groups on separate rings.  Compared to the parent ferrocene, the diamine is about 600 mV more reducing.

It can be prepared from the diisocyanate , which in turn is derived from 1,1'-ferrocenedicarboxylic acid.  1,1'-Diaminoferrocene was originally prepared by hydrogenation of 1,1'-diazidoferrocene.

1,1'-Diaminoferrocene has been incorporated into various diamide and diimine ligands, which form catalysts that exhibit redox switching.

References

Ferrocenes
Cyclopentadienyl complexes
Diamines